Parakamosia is a genus of beetles in the family Buprestidae, containing the following species:

 Parakamosia camerunica Thery, 1932
 Parakamosia carnithorax Obenberger, 1924
 Parakamosia margotana Novak, 1988
 Parakamosia muehlei Novak, 1988
 Parakamosia parva Bellamy, 1986
 Parakamosia zophera Bellamy, 1986
 Parakamosia zoufali Obenberger, 1924

References

Buprestidae genera